Five Points is a metro station of the Metropolitan Atlanta Rapid Transit Authority (MARTA) rail system in Atlanta, Georgia. It is the transfer point for all rail lines and serves as the main transportation hub for MARTA. It provides access to Station Soccer, the Five Points Business District, Underground Atlanta, City Hall, the Richard B. Russell Federal Building, CobbLinc (Formerly known as Cobb Community Transit), Ride Gwinnett (Formerly known as Gwinnett County Transit), GRTA Xpress Transit, and the tourism heart of Downtown Atlanta. It provides connecting bus service to Zoo Atlanta, Grant Park, Atlanta University Center, East Atlanta Village, Martin Luther King Jr. National Historical Park, Carter Center, Atlanta City Hall, South Dekalb Mall and  Fulton County Government Center.

Despite being considered a subway, only the Red and Gold Lines are underground and use a tunnel under Broad Street between Garnett and Peachtree Center.  The Blue and Green Lines, on the second level, are located at-grade below the intersecting elevated street viaducts in Downtown Atlanta.

Station layout

 
The station is composed of three levels, and an additional plaza level. At the surface is the plaza level, which provides access to the concourse level, Alabama Street, and shopping along a pedestrian only portion of Broad Street. The plaza level also houses the MARTA police precinct. The plaza level connects to the concourse level, which has the faregates and provides access to the rail platforms. Outside the paid area are the MARTA Ride Store, Reduced Fare Office, and Lost and Found, and a Zip car address. Outside the faregates are stairs to Peachtree Street, Alabama Street, and Forsyth Street. Within the faregates are restrooms, an information kiosk, and stairs to the platforms. Directly underneath the concourse level are the Blue Line and Green Line platforms. Running underneath and perpendicular to the Blue/Green platforms are the Red Line and Gold Line platforms. At the end of the platform is the original facade of the Eiseman Building, which was demolished to make way for the station; however, the facade is more visible from some of the platforms. Elevators provide disabled access to all levels of the station. This is the busiest station in the MARTA system, handling an average of 57,000 people per business day, and over 27,000 on weekends.

History
Preliminary planning and design of the entire MARTA heavy rail system began in 1967 after Georgia state legislature approval of MARTA's 1966 creation, with early blueprints ready in mid-1968. Design and engineering began in 1973; existing properties were acquired, demolished and underwent site preparation in 1974–1975, and actual construction began in early 1976. The station was constructed using the cut-and-cover method.  The Gold Line (then called North-South line) was built beneath Broad Street, and the Blue Line (then called East-West line) was constructed next to the railroad freight lines that run through Downtown Atlanta. Five Points opened on December 22, 1979 with only the original East-West platform open. The initial opening of the station was almost delayed because of construction on the lower level. The North-South platform did not open until December 4, 1981.
Major renovations to both the east and west street-level plazas of the station began in April 2006.

In 2016, a section of the station was converted into a small soccer field funded by MARTA and Atlanta United FC, the city's new Major League Soccer team. A tunnel to Underground Atlanta was located on the Peachtree Street side of the station, just outside of the faregates. It closed in 2017, in combination with the closure of Underground Atlanta for renovations, and is now inaccessible from both Five Points and Underground Atlanta. Another tunnel existed that led to Rich's (department store) from 1979 to 1991 when the department store was closed, and eventually demolished in 1994. The tunnel remains and is now an employee entrance to the Sam Nunn Atlanta Federal Center.

Attractions
Station Soccer
City Hall
Fulton County Annex
Richard B. Russell Federal Building
Five Points (Atlanta)
Sam Nunn Atlanta Federal Center
Underground Atlanta
Rich's (department store) (formerly)

Bus routes
The station is served by the following MARTA bus routes:
Route 3 -  Martin Luther King Jr. Drive / Auburn Avenue
Route 21 - Memorial Drive
Route 26 - Marietta Street / Perry Boulevard.
Route 40 - Peachtree Street / Downtown
Route 42 - Pryor Road.
Route 49 - McDonough Boulevard
Route 55 - Jonesboro Road
Route 186 - Rainbow Drive / South DeKalb
Route 813 - Atlanta Student Movement Blvd.
Route 816 - North Highland Avenue

Connection to other transit systems
CobbLinc
Ride Gwinnett
Georgia Regional Transportation Authority

References

External links
MARTA Station Page
nycsubway.org Atlanta page
Photo showing construction of the Five Points MARTA station - #1
Photo showing construction of the Five Points MARTA station - #2
Forsyth Street entrance from Google Maps Street View
Peachtree Street entrance from Google Maps Street View

Gallery 

1979 establishments in Georgia (U.S. state)
Blue Line (MARTA)
Gold Line (MARTA)
Green Line (MARTA)
Red Line (MARTA)
Metropolitan Atlanta Rapid Transit Authority stations
Railway stations in the United States opened in 1979
Railway stations in Atlanta